The 1990–91 Irish Cup was the 111th edition of Northern Ireland's premier football knock-out cup competition. It concluded on 4 May 1991 with the final.

Glentoran were the defending champions after winning their 15th Irish Cup last season, defeating Portadown 3–0 in the 1990 final. This season Portadown went one better by winning their first Irish cup in their fifth appearance in the final. They defeated Glenavon 2–1 in the final.

Results

First round
The following teams were given byes into the second round: Ards Rangers, Armagh City, Ballymoney United, Crumlin United, Kilmore Rec., Limavady United, Magherafelt Sky Blues, Nitos Athletic, Portglenone, Rathfriland Rangers, Saintfield United, Sirocco Works and Star of the Sea.

|}

Replays

|}

Second round

|}

Replays

|}

Third round

|}

Replay

|}

Fourth round

|}

Replays

|}

Fifth round

|}

Replays

|}

Sixth round

|}

Replays

|}

Quarter-finals

|}

Replay

|}

Semi-finals

|}

Final

References

1990–91
1990–91 domestic association football cups
Cup